Dane Ashton Cruikshank (born April 27, 1995) is an American football safety of the National Football League (NFL). He played college football at Arizona. Cruikshank was drafted by the Tennessee Titans in the fifth round of the 2018 NFL Draft.

College career
Cruikshank majored in general studies at Arizona after playing at Citrus College for the 2013 and 2014 seasons. He was named first-team all-state.

2015 season
He redshirted the 2015 season at Arizona.

2016 season
As a redshirt junior in 2016, he played cornerback, tying the team lead in interceptions with two, finishing fourth in total tackles with 60 and second in pass breakups with seven.

2017 season
As a redshirt senior in 2017, he switched to safety, ranking fifth on the team with 75 total tackles, tying for second in interceptions with three and ranking third in pass breakups with five.

Professional career

Tennessee Titans
Cruikshank was drafted by the Tennessee Titans in the fifth round (152nd overall) of the 2018 NFL Draft. On May 11, 2018, he signed a four-year contract worth $2,747,892 with $287,892 in guarantees.

2018 season

On September 16, 2018, he scored his first NFL touchdown on a fake punt against the Houston Texans by hauling in a 66-yard reception from Kevin Byard. Cruikshank was named AFC Special Teams Player of the Week for his performance in the 20–17 victory.

Cruikshank finished his rookie year with 11 tackles, 39 return yards, 66 receiving yards, and a touchdown.

2019 season
On December 1, 2019, vs the Indianapolis Colts at Lucas Oil Stadium, Cruikshank blocked a fourth-quarter field goal attempt by Adam Vinatieri, which backup cornerback Tye Smith scooped up and took 63 yards for a go-ahead touchdown that sent Tennessee on its way to a 31-17 victory.

“We take special teams very seriously over here,” Cruikshank said following the game. “Everybody takes advantage of their opportunities and I rose to the occasion (Sunday) and made the best of it.”

2020 season
On September 6, 2020, Cruikshank was placed on injured reserve. He was activated on October 24, 2020. In week 7 against the Pittsburgh Steelers, Cruikshank recorded his first career interception off a pass thrown by Ben Roethlisberger during the 27–24 loss. He was placed back on injured reserve on November 11, ending his season.

2021 season
Cruikshank was placed on injured reserve after missing a week of practice with a knee injury on November 13, 2021. He was activated on December 11.

Chicago Bears
On March 31, 2022, Cruikshank signed with the Chicago Bears. He was placed on injured reserve on November 30.

References

External links
Tennessee Titans bio

1995 births
Living people
American football cornerbacks
American football safeties
Arizona Wildcats football players
People from Chino Hills, California
Sportspeople from San Bernardino County, California
Players of American football from California
Tennessee Titans players
Chicago Bears players